Oldwoods Halt was a minor station located north of Shrewsbury on the GWR's  to  main line. It was opened in the nineteen thirties as part of the GWR's halt construction programme, aimed at combatting growing competition from bus services. Today the route is part of the Shrewsbury to Chester line. Nothing now remains of the halt although the area of the adjacent goods siding/s can still be seen on the west side of the line.

Historical Services
Express trains did not call at Oldwoods Halt, only local services.

According to the Official Handbook of Stations the following classes of traffic were being handled at this station in 1956: G*, and there was a 15 cwt crane.

References

Neighbouring stations

External links
 Oldwoods Halt on navigable 1946 O.S. map
 Disused Stations: Oldwoods Halt

Disused railway stations in Shropshire
Former Great Western Railway stations
Railway stations in Great Britain opened in 1933
Railway stations in Great Britain closed in 1960